was a village located in Nasu District, Tochigi Prefecture, Japan.

As of 2003, the village had an estimated population of 5,225 and a density of 159.88 persons per km². The total area was 32.68 km².

On October 1, 2005, Yuzukami, along with the town of Kurobane (also from Nasu District), was merged into the expanded city of Ōtawara.

External links
 Ōtawara official website 

Dissolved municipalities of Tochigi Prefecture